

Qualifying system
For the team event, the 5 continental champions and 3 further non-qualified teams from an Olympic Qualifying Tournament will qualify for the 2012 Summer Olympics. For the duet event, the same teams will qualify plus a further 16 non-qualified teams from the Olympic Qualifying Tournament will qualify. The host nation is considered European champion, whilst the best-placed teams from Asia, Africa & Oceania at the 2011 World Aquatics Championships will be considered as the respective continental champions.

Qualification summary

Qualification timeline

The Asian, Oceania and African qualification tournament will be at the World Aquatics Championships.

Women's team

Women's duet

References

Qualification for the 2012 Summer Olympics
2011 in synchronized swimming
2012 in synchronized swimming